Shingle Street is a coastal settlement on the North Sea coast of the English county of Suffolk. It is within the parish of Hollesley with HM Young Offender Institution Hollesley Bay Colony nearby. A report from October 2004 suggests that Shingle Street is at risk from coastal erosion and flooding and could disappear within 20 years if sea defences are not erected.

History
Shingle Street was originally a home for fishermen and river pilots for the River Ore. Early in the 19th century a Martello tower was built, which was later a home for coastguards. Many of the original buildings date from this period. A public house called the Old Beach House had been built here out of drift wood. Richard Cobbold mentions that in 1797 this public house being kept by Jacob Merrells who was also a pilot. However in 1810 this was replaced by a pre-fabricated wooden building built in Ipswich in the yard of the Cliff Brewery. It was then brought to Shingle Street by barge and named the Lifeboat Inn. The pub was one of 300 pubs owned by Cobbolds Brewery and was pictured in Souvenir of the Bi-Centenery of the Cliff Brewery in Ipswich.

World War II 

Several buildings were destroyed during World War II, including the Lifeboat Inn.

After World War II many strange happenings were reported to have taken place at Shingle Street, including a failed German invasion. 
Since the civilian population had been evacuated in May 1940, there were no eyewitness reports, although official documents remained classified until questions in the House of Commons led to their early release in 1993.
These papers disclosed no German landing. Rumours of a failed invasion on the South and East Coasts were commonplace in September 1940 and helped to boost morale. Author James Hayward has proposed that these rumours, which were widely reported in the American press, were a successful example of black propaganda with an aim of ensuring American co-operation and securing lend lease resources by showing that the United Kingdom was capable of successfully resisting the German Army.

Shingle Street in culture
Shingle Street was the inspiration of the Thomas Dolby song "Cloudburst at Shingle Street", from the 1982 album The Golden Age of Wireless.

The Shingle Street Shell Line

In 2005 stonecutter Lida Cardozo Kindersley and her childhood friend Els Bottema started to arrange a line of shells on the beach, beginning as a way of coping with their shared experience of cancer treatment. After regular visits to add to the line by 2018 it stretched for more than 275m and was made up of 20,000 individual whelk shells. A short documentary film about the work, entitled 'C shells', was released in 2017, followed by a book The Shingle Street Shell Line in 2018.

References

Further reading

External links
 

Hamlets in Suffolk
Invasions of England
Beaches of Suffolk